Private Line is the debut solo album by Gerald Levert, following his tenure with the group LeVert. It was released by EastWest Records on October 15, 1991 in the United States. The album reached number one on the US Top R&B/Hip-Hop Albums where it spent two weeks atop in 1992. Private Line also topped the Top Heatseekers album chart and peaked at number 48 on the Billboard 200. It spawned four singles:  the title track, "School Me," "Can U Handle It" and "Baby Hold On to Me," the last of which is a duet with his father, Eddie Levert.

Track listing

Charts

Weekly charts

Year-end charts

Certifications

See also
List of number-one R&B albums of 1992 (U.S.)

References

1991 debut albums
Gerald Levert albums
East West Records albums